Brent A. Moss (January 30, 1972 – November 13, 2022) was an American professional football player who was a running back in the National Football League (NFL). He played college football for the Wisconsin Badgers from 1991–1994. Moss played in the NFL with the Miami Dolphins and St. Louis Rams.

High school career
Brent Moss was a 3-year (1986–1989) letter winner in football as tailback at Racine Park High School in Racine, Wisconsin where he wore number 31 and rushed for over 5,000 yards. During the November 12, 1988 Division I Wisconsin WIAA State Football Championship Game, as a junior Moss rushed for 202 yards and 3 touchdowns on the turf of Camp Randall Stadium in Madison, Wisconsin.  This led the Racine Park Panthers to a victory over the Superior Spartans 34-14 and the State Football Championship for Wisconsin's highest division.  Moss was named the game's MVP and was later named 1st team All-State (WIAA).  During the 1989 season at Racine Park, Moss would also be named 1st team All-State (WIAA) and led the Panthers to the state semi-final game.

College career
The Badgers defeated the #13 UCLA Bruins 21-16 to claim their first ever Rose Bowl victory. Moss was a big part of the win, rushing for 158 yards and two touchdowns en route to being honored the game's MVP. He was also voted the Big Ten's most valuable player that year and was the recipient of the Silver Football, awarded by the Chicago Tribune as the Big Ten's player of the year for 1993.

1991: Ran for 219 yards and one touchdown on 61 carries.
1992: Ran for 739 yards and 9 TD on 165 carries.
1993: Ran for 1,637 yards and 16 TD on 312 carries.
1994: Ran for 833 yards and 8 TD on 156 carries.

Professional career
Although not drafted the following year, he was invited to the Miami Dolphins training camp. After being cut, Moss then signed with the St. Louis Rams and in the 1995 season he accumulated 90 yards on 22 carries. This was his only playing time in the National Football League and he was released by the Rams during the team's 1996 summer training camp.  This was followed by a brief off season stint with the Green Bay Packers in 1997 and brief stints in the World League of American Football, the Arena Football League, and the XFL.  After a seven-year hiatus from football dating back to 2000, Moss returned to the football field with his hometown, minor league, Racine Raiders in July 2007.

Personal life and death
In 1994, Moss pleaded guilty to a misdemeanor charge of possession of cocaine and was sentenced to two years' probation and a $250 fine. In 2005, he pleaded guilty to misdemeanor possession of cocaine, felony bail jumping, and misdemeanor resisting or obstructing an officer.  In 2017, he was sentenced to one year in prison and one year on extended supervision on a felony possession of cocaine charge, and three years  probation for delivering heroin in amount of 3 grams or less.

Moss died on November 13, 2022, at the age of 50.

References

External links
Just Sports Stats
NFL stats

1972 births
2022 deaths
Sportspeople from Racine, Wisconsin
Players of American football from Wisconsin
American football running backs
Wisconsin Badgers football players
St. Louis Rams players
Amsterdam Admirals players
Memphis Maniax players